...bugiardo più che mai... più incosciente che mai... is a studio album by Italian singer Mina, released on November 1969 by PDU.

Overview
The album features only new songs, with the exception of "Un'ombra" and "I problemi del cuore", published in October as a single, and the song "Non credere", which was released as a single in April with the B-side "Dai dai domani", which was not included on the album. The singles "Bugiardo e incosciente" / "Una mezza dozzina di rose" and "Un giorno come un altro" / "Il poeta" were also released from the album, but the following year.

"Non c'è che lui" is a cover version of the song presented a few months before the release of the album by Sonia and Armando Saviniat the Sanremo Music Festival. Another cover version on the album, "Com açucar, com afeto", is sung in Portuguese, it was written by Chico Buarque and previously performed by Nara Leão.

The song "Emmanuelle" was the main theme song for the film A Man for Emmanuelle, and the song "Attimo per attimo" became the soundtrack for the film Sissignore.

The album spent 22 weeks at the top of the Italian album chart, which is one of the best figures ever, and also became the best-selling in Italy in 1970.

Track listing

Charts

References

External links
 

Mina (Italian singer) albums
Italian-language albums
1969 albums